The 66th Directors Guild of America Awards, honoring the outstanding directorial achievements in films, documentary and television in 2013, were presented on January 25, 2014 at the Hyatt Regency Century Plaza. The ceremony was hosted by Jane Lynch. The nominees for the feature film category were announced on January 7, 2014, the nominations for the television and commercial categories were announced on January 9, 2014, and the nominees for documentary directing were announced on January 13, 2014.

Winners and nominees

Film

Television

Commercials

Frank Capra Achievement Award
 Lee Blaine

Robert B. Aldrich Service Award
 Steven Soderbergh

Franklin J. Schaffner Achievement Award
 Vince DeDario

Diversity Award
 Shonda Rhimes
 Betsy Beers

References

External links
 

Directors Guild of America Awards
2013 film awards
2013 television awards
Direct
Direct
2014 awards in the United States